Dharmsinh Desai University (DDU) formerly known as Dharmsinh Desai Institute of Technology (DDIT) is a state funded institution in Nadiad, Gujarat, India and was founded on 2 January 1968.

History
Dharmsinh Desai Institute of Technology was founded in 1968 by Dharmsinh Desai, who then was a member of Parliament, as an institution of higher learning in the field of Engineering and Technology. It achieved autonomous status under Gujarat University in 1991, and Deemed University status in June 2000.

In 2005 the institute achieved full university status and was renamed Dharmsinh Desai University. The university initiated a bachelor's course in Dental Surgery in 2005, while the Faculty of Pharmacy was established at the University in 2006. It is the first university in Gujarat to obtain the permission to start Nanotechnology courses in 2012. The university was granted the permission by Medical Council of India, to start new Medical college from the academic year 2019–20.

Recognition
 In November 2013, the 'Oxford Summit of Leaders', an organisation in UK, chose the university as the best regional university. This is the first time the Oxford group has given this award to a university outside Europe.
 In 2015 DDU was ranked among "Asia’s 100 Best and Fastest way Educational Institutes 2014-15" by the WCRC Leaders Asian Education Excellence Summit & Awards.

Status
DDIT achieved autonomous university status in 1991 which meant it could conduct exams and not follow the parent university, Gujarat University, examination schedule (though the degree certificate awarded still retained the name of Gujarat University). It achieved a Deemed University status in June 2000, which meant that the degree certificates show that they are awarded from DDIT. In April 2005, DDIT achieved full university status and was renamed DDU, an abbreviation for Dharmsinh Desai University. The entire academic process is certified by ISO 9001:2008 by KPMG, United States.

Campus
The university is located on the northern Bank of Mahi Canal and the southern outskirts of Nadiad city about 3 km from Nadiad railway station and 2 km from Mahatma Gandhi Expressway Nadiad toll plaza. The nearest international airport Sardar Vallabhbhai Patel International Airport, Ahmedabad is 60 km from DDU. The DDU campus is spread over 42 acres of land.

Industry and University links

The faculty has links with industries such as Reliance Industries for R & D, KHS GmbH Germany for training students abroad, and TCS, Infosys for students training under the campus network. The University further signed a MoU with Bosch Rexroth in 2013, under which special labs and training opportunities will be made available for students studying in Mechanical Engineering, Electronics and Communications Engineering and Instrumentation and Control Engineering. It has a Memorandum of Understanding with the University of Iowa, USA, for the BE+MS five-year integrated program.

Ranking
Dharamsinh Desai University has been ranked as the 88th best Engineering College of India in the Edu-Rand Rankings of 2015. The survey was done jointly by Edu, an Indian company and Rand Corporation, an American think tank.

The university was ranked 101-150 band among universities in India by the National Institutional Ranking Framework (NIRF) in 2020.

Faculty of Technology
The Faculty of Technology of DDU grants Bachelor of Technology (BTech) and Master of Technology (MTech) in various engineering fields. The faculty of technology started offering Degree and Diploma in Chemical Engineering (1968), then Degree courses in Civil Engineering (1981), Electronics and Communication Engineering (1981), Computer Engineering (1985), Instrumentation and control engineering (1985), and Information Technology (1999). It also added Post Graduate level course including Master of Technology (MTech) in Chemical Engineering (1981), then in Electronics and Communication Engineering (1986), Civil Engineering (1986), Instrumentation and control engineering (2002), Computer Engineering (2002). All engineering Degree is accredited by the All India Council for Technical Education and all its departments are accredited by the National Board of Accreditation.

There are different departments in faculty of technology listed below.
 Chemical engineering department
 Civil engineering department
 Computer engineering department
 Electronics and communication engineering department
 Information and technology engineering department
 Instrumentation and control engineering department
 Mechanical engineering department

Centers

Shah-Schulman Centre for Surface Science & Nanotechnology
Shah-Schulman Centre for Surface Science and Nanotechnology (SSCSSN) was established in April 2008 under as a partnership between Dharmsinh Desai University, government and industry. SSCSSN is established in the Faculty of Technology, Dharmsinh Desai University (DDU), Nadiad, Gujarat, India with initial funding from Industries & Mines Department, Government of Gujarat. The SSCSSN is a research and development center that accommodates about 21 sophisticated instruments to carry out research and analysis in Surface Science and Nanotechnology. SSCSSN has entered into tri-partite agreement with University of Florida and Columbia University under the IUCRC program of National Science Foundation, United States. Dept. of Science &  Technology. India will support this program in India.  Under this program 25 companies have joined SSCSSN as Industry Advisory Board Members for Industry oriented research activities. SSCSSN-DDU is one of the first such partners from Gujarat to enter into this NSF sponsored International program. The Centre also has collaborative projects with nearby Universities in these areas as well as overseas Institutions in Sweden, Taiwan and United States. Centre also offers a Master of Technology course in Surface Science and Nanotechnology. A doctoral student from Shah-Schulman Centre for Surface Science and Nanotechnology was among 30-odd students from India to attend the 68th Lindau Nobel Laureate Meeting in Germany.

Anchor Institute (Chemicals & Petrochemicals)
Anchor Institute (Chemicals & Petrochemicals) was established in 2008
with an objective of taking various initiatives in creating readily employable and industry responsive Man Power, at all level for chemicals & Petrochemicals across the State. This includes preparing Course curriculum and benchmarking and Training for the Trainers/Faculties.

R&D centre, DDU
DDU has a R&D centre since 1998 and its main objective is to carry out research activity in the area of Information Technology, Computer Science, Computer Application and Electronics & Communication with the respective faculty members. R & D centre has guided several projects of under-graduate and post-graduate students in very diverse areas. The R&D Center undertakes real life IT based projects from Industry and Research organizations including Government and provides technical solutions to their problems. The R&D facility is also extended to final year students for their final year project work. The R&D centre of the University has developed a Portrait Building System which is successfully used at every District Police Headquarters in the Country to arrest criminals.

Projects of Computer Engg. Department, Faculty of Technology
The ANUVADAKSH An Expert English to Indian Languages Machine Translation System [EILMT] allows translating the text from English to eight Indian languages namely Hindi, Urdu, Bengali, Marathi, Tamil, Oriya, Gujarati and Bodo. The domains considered are tourism and healthcare. The project was funded by Department of Electronics and Information Technology, Government of India under TDIL program - Technology Development for Indian Languages. This is a Multi-Lingual, Multi-platform & Multi engine hybrid System, being developed by Consortia of 13 Institutes in India C-DAC Mumbai, IIIT Hyderabad, IISc Bangalore, IIT Bombay, Jadavpur University, Amrita University, IIIT-A, Banasthali Vidyapeeth and Utkal University, Dharmsinh Desai University, North Maharashtra University and North Eastern Hill University where C-DAC Pune is working as a Consortia Leader.

Indradhanush WordNet is a mission mode project funded by Ministry of Communications and Information Technology, Government of India, New Delhi and executed by a consortium of nine academic institutions from all over India. The title of the project is Development of Indradhanush: an Integrated WordNet for Bengali, Gujarati, Kashmiri, Konkani, Odia, Punjabi and Urdu. These WordNets are developed at different institutes in India and co-ordinated by IIT Bombay. These WordNets are constructed and linked to Hindi and English WordNets and amongst each other. The institutions involved in this WordNet development activity were: Goa University, IIT Bombay, Indian Statistical Institute, University of Kashmir, University of Hyderabad, Punjabi University, Thapar University, Dharmsinh Desai University and Jawaharlal Nehru University.

Environmental Audit & Consultancy Service Cell
The University has an Environmental Audit and Consultancy Service Cell. The scope of environmental audit covers i) industrial data collection related to raw material, process, product, by-product and other inputs like water and power, ii) monitoring of environmental management system (air, water and waste water, noise, solid waste and bioassay test) and iii) preparation of audit report as per Gujarat Pollution Control Board (GPCB) format.

The additional services extended by the Cell include Environmental Impact Assessment, Total Pollution Load Assessment, Designing and Monitoring of Common Effluent Treatment Plant (CETP), Evaluation of Environmental Management System etc.

Some of the major clients are Reliance, IPCL, GNFC, GEB, L&T, UltraTech Cement, BASF, Bayer, Rallis India Ltd, Sun Pharma, Cadila Healthcare, Birla, Cellulosic, Cadila Pharma, GAIL, Kanoria chemicals, Wockhardt, Tata Chemicals etc.

Structural Design Centre
Established in 2000, Structural Design Centre at university caters to the structural analysis and design needs of the industry, government and non-governmental organizations.

The centre provides consultancy works related to static and dynamic analysis, structural design and failure analysis of various Civil and Industrial/infrastructure structures.

Faculty of Management and Information Science
Faculty of Management and Information Science was established at University in 1999 offering B.B.A, M.B.A, B.C.A and M.C.A course.

Faculty of Pharmacy
Faculty of Pharmacy was established at University in 2006 offering B.Pham course. Faculty of Pharmacy is approved by Pharmacy Council of India. It also offers M.Pharm in Pharmaceutics & Pharmaceutical Technology and Quality assurance and Doctoral programs in various disciplines of Pharmacy.

Faculty of Dental Science
Faculty of Dental Science (FDS) was established at University in 2005 offering postgraduate and under graduate education in dental science.

Doctoral programme
Doctoral level programmes in Engineering/Technology, Management, Pharmacy, Applied Sciences, Physical Sciences and Social Science were initiated in 2001.

Notable alumni
 Vijay Patel, an Indian lawyer and a former member of parliament
 Axar Patel, an Indian cricketer
 Ketan R. Patel, Chairman & Managing Director of Troikaa Pharmaceuticals

References

Engineering colleges in Gujarat
Dharamsinh Desai University
Kheda district
1968 establishments in Gujarat
Educational institutions established in 1968